Lucille La Verne (November 7, 1872 – March 4, 1945) was an American actress known for her appearances in early sound films, as well as for her triumphs on the American stage. She is most widely remembered as the voices of the Old Witch in the 1932 Silly Symphony short, Babes in the Woods, and the first Disney villain, the Evil Queen, Snow White's wicked stepmother from Snow White and the Seven Dwarfs (1937), Walt Disney's first full-length animated feature film as well as her final film role.

Biography
La Verne was born near Nashville, Tennessee, on November 7, 1872. She began her career as a child in local summer stock. As a teenager, she performed in small touring theater troupes. When she was 14, she played both Juliet and Lady Macbeth back to back. Her ability to play almost any part quickly caught the attention of more prolific companies, and she made her Broadway debut in 1888. She then became a leading lady with some of the best stock companies in America, scoring triumphs in San Francisco, Boston, and other cities. She eventually ran her own successful stock company.

On the New York stage, she was known for her range and versatility. Among her hits on Broadway were principal roles in Uncle Tom's Cabin, Seven Days and Way Down East. She was also known for her blackface roles. Her biggest stage triumph came in 1923 when she created the role of Widow Caggle in the hit play Sun Up. With her Broadway run, US tour, and European tour, La Verne gave over 3,000 performances. She also worked on Broadway as a playwright and director. In the late 1920s, a Broadway theater was named for her for a short period of time.

She made her motion picture debut in 1915 in the movie Over Night directed by James Young. She also performed small parts in the movies Polly of the Circus, directed by Charles Thomas Horan and Edwin L. Hollywood,  
and Orphans of the Storm, directed by D.W. Griffith. Her best known part is that of the voice of the Evil Queen, and her alter ego the old hag, from Disney's 1937 animated film Snow White and the Seven Dwarfs, which was her final film performance.

Death
Lucille La Verne died at the age of 72 in Culver City, California on March 4, 1945, after suffering from cancer. She was interred at Inglewood Park Cemetery.  La Verne's grave was unmarked for nearly 75 years before fans took up a collection to ensure that she had a stone.

Filmography

1915: Over Night as Minor Role
1916: Sweet Kitty Bellairs as Lady Maria (as Lucille Lavarney)
1916: The Thousand-Dollar Husband as Mme. Batavia (as Lucille La Varney)
1917: Polly of the Circus as Mandy
1918: The Life Mask as Sarah Harden
1918: Tempered Steel as Old Mammy
1919: The Praise Agent as Mrs. Eubanks
1921: Orphans of the Storm as Mother Frochard
1923: The White Rose as 'Auntie' Easter (as Lucille Laverne)
1923: Zaza as Aunt Rosa
1923: Among the Missing as The Mother
1924: America as Refugee Mother (as Lucile La Verne)
1924: His Darker Self as Aunt Lucy
1925: Sun-Up as Mother
1928: The Last Moment as Innkeeper
1930: Abraham Lincoln as mid-wife
1930: Sinners' Holiday as Mrs. Delano (as Lucille LaVerne)
1930: Du Barry, Woman of Passion as Minor Role (voice, uncredited)
1930: The Comeback   (Short)
1931: Little Caesar as Ma Magdalena (uncredited)
1931: The Great Meadow as Elvira Jarvis
1931: An American Tragedy as Mrs. Asa Griffiths
1931: 24 Hours as Mrs. Dacklehorse
1931: The Unholy Garden as Lucie Villars
1932: Union Depot as lady with pipe (uncredited)
1932: She Wanted a Millionaire as Mother Norton
1932: Alias the Doctor as Martha Brenner, Karl's foster mother (as Lucille LaVerne)
1932: While Paris Sleeps as Mme. Golden Bonnet
1932: Hearts of Humanity as Mrs. Sneider
1932: Breach of Promise as Mrs. Flynn
1932: Babes in the Woods (Short) as Witch (voice, uncredited)
1932: A Strange Adventure as Miss Sheen
1932: Wild Horse Mesa as Ma [The General] Melberne
1933: Father Noah's Ark (short) as Noah's Wife
1933: Pilgrimage as Mrs. Kelly Hatfield
1933: The Last Trail as Mrs. Wilson
1934: Beloved as Mrs. Briggs
1934: School for Girls as Miss Keeble
1934: Kentucky Kernels as Aunt Hannah (as Lucille LaVerne)
1934: The Mighty Barnum as Joice Heth
1935: A Tale of Two Cities as The Vengeance (as Lucille LaVerne)
1936: Hearts of Humanity as Minor Role
1936: Ellis Island as Radio (voice, uncredited)
1937: Snow White and the Seven Dwarfs as the Evil Queen / Old Hag (voice, uncredited) (final film role)

References

External links

 
 
 
 

1872 births
1945 deaths
Actresses from Tennessee
American film actresses
American silent film actresses
19th-century American actresses
American stage actresses
American voice actresses
People from Nashville, Tennessee
20th-century American actresses
Deaths from cancer in California
Burials at Inglewood Park Cemetery